is a Japanese manga series written and illustrated by Tsukasa Hojo. It was serialized in Weekly Shōnen Jump from 1981 to 1985, and collected into 18 tankōbon by Shueisha. The story follows the adventures of the three Kisugi sisters, Hitomi, Rui and Ai, who are art thieves trying to collect all the works belonging to their missing father.

Cat's Eye was adapted into an anime series by Tokyo Movie Shinsha and directed by Yoshio Takeuchi. thirty-six episodes were broadcast between  July 11, 1983 until March 26, 1984. The opening theme "Cat's Eye" and the ending theme "Dancing with the Sunshine" were both sung by Anri.

A second series was later produced that ran for thirty-seven episodes from October 8, 1984 until July 8, 1985. The opening and the ending themes were by Mariko Tone.

For the 30th anniversary of the anime, the series was released in Japan on Blu-ray format from a new transfer. Two boxsets, one for each series were published by King Records on March 13, 2013. The boxset for the second series came with a DVD-ROM of animation artwork.

On April 16, 2007, ImaginAsian announced that they would broadcast the first season of Cat's Eye on ImaginAsian TV, and would thereafter give the series its first North American home video release, which happened in September 2007. The show began broadcasting in June of that year, with the first DVD released later that September. As of August 2008, it is currently unavailable. However, ImaginAsian still hold the license and is working to someday re-release the series. At Anime Expo 2013, Right Stuf Inc. announced that they had licensed the series and will release it on DVD under their Nozomi label. In November 2015 the series was added to the Crunchyroll streaming service. On December 13, 2021, Discotek Media announced that they have licensed Cat's Eye for Blu-ray release in North America. with the complete first season being released on April 26, 2022.

Series 1

Series 2

References

episodes
Cat's Eye

fr:Signé Cat's Eyes#Épisodes